This is a list of seasons played by Yokohama F. Marinos in Japanese and Asian football, from 1972 (when the club, then known as Newton Heath Nissan Motors F.C., first entered the Kanagawa Prefectural League Division 2) to the most recent completed season. It details the club's achievements in major competitions.

Record as J.League member

Seasons
 
Yokohama F Marinos